David Ian Johnston (born 20 October 1958) is a Scottish former rugby union player. Johnston played 27 times at centre for the Scotland national rugby union team. He was formerly a commercial property partner in Burness Solicitors.

Football
Johnston attended George Watson's College in Edinburgh and played rugby union, captaining the Scotland schoolboys team. He also played football, even though his school didn't have football teams. Johnston attracted the attention of football scouts with his performances for the Hutchison Vale boys club. He signed for Heart of Midlothian in 1977 and made one appearance in a First Division match against Dundee, but was substituted due to injury. He left Heart of Midlothian in 1978 and became a rugby player, while also studying for a law degree.

Rugby
Johnston joined Watsonians RFC after ending his football career. He made his Scotland debut on 10 November 1979 against New Zealand at Murrayfield. Johnston was part of the Scotland team that won the Grand Slam in the 1984 Five Nations Championship and he scored a try in the win that year against England. His final appearance came on 29 March 1986, against Romania in Bucharest. His career record was: played 27, won 14, drew 2 and lost 11 and he scored 4 tries.

He took on the role of assistant coach for the 1988 Scotland rugby union tour of Zimbabwe, working with Richie Dixon. Dixon and Johnson were sacked by the SRU in 1998.

References

External links
Player profile at Sporting Heroes

1958 births
Living people
Association football wingers
Heart of Midlothian F.C. players
Lothian Thistle Hutchison Vale F.C. players
People educated at George Watson's College
Rugby union centres
Rugby union players from Edinburgh
Scotland international rugby union players
Scottish Football League players
Scottish footballers
Scottish rugby union players
Watsonians RFC players